
Restaurant Adrian is a defunct restaurant in Amsterdam, Netherlands. It was a fine dining restaurant that was awarded one Michelin star in 1967 and retained that rating until 1970.

External links
 Interior restaurant Adrian

See also
List of Michelin starred restaurants in the Netherlands

References 

Restaurants in Amsterdam
Michelin Guide starred restaurants in the Netherlands
Defunct restaurants in the Netherlands